General Rogers may refer to:

Bernard W. Rogers (1921–2008), U.S. Army general
Bob Rogers (SAAF officer) (1921–2000), South African Air Force lieutenant general
Charles Calvin Rogers (1929–1990), U.S. Army major general
Craven C. Rogers Jr. (1934–2016), U.S. Air Force lieutenant general
Elmer J. Rogers Jr. (1903–2002), U.S. Air Force lieutenant general
F. Michael Rogers (1921–2014), U.S. Air Force general
Ford O. Rogers (1894–1972), U.S. Marine Corps major general
Gordon Byrom Rogers (1901–1967), U.S. Army lieutenant general
Harry Lovejoy Rogers (1867–1925), U.S. Army major general
Paul D. Rogers (fl. 1980s–2020s), Michigan Army National Guard major general
Robert Montresor Rogers (1834–1895), British Army major general
William W. Rogers (1893–1976), U.S. Marine Corps major general

See also
Attorney General Rogers (disambiguation)